Faidiva of Toulouse (1133 – 1154) was a Countess Consort of Savoy by marriage to Humbert III, Count of Savoy, with the wedding occurring in 1151. 

She was the daughter of Alfonso Jordan. 

She died childless.

References

1133 births
1154 deaths
Countesses of Savoy